Wawrzyniec Żmurko (9 July 1824, in Jaworów – 3 April 1889, in Lwów) was a Polish mathematician, professor of Lwów University and Lwów Polytechnic, honoris causa of Lwów University, member of Polish Academy of Learning. He was a president of Polish Copernicus Society of Naturalists (1879-1881). In 1885-1886 he was Rector of the Lwów University. He was the father of a painter, Franciszek Żmurko.

Work 
Żmurko was active in a number of different fields in mathematics, including differential equations, analytic functions theory, linear algebra and applications of mathematics. He published in both Polish and German.
He also invented instruments for drawing conic sections and a device which he called the integrator for graphical solving of calculus integral problems.

References
 

19th-century Polish mathematicians
1824 births
1889 deaths
Burials at Lychakiv Cemetery
University of Lviv rectors
People from Yavoriv